This is a list of cities in Association of Southeast Asian Nations (ASEAN).

Largest urban cities
The followings are the contiguous urban areas in ASEAN or Southeast Asia, according to Demographia's "World Urban Areas" study. Demographia defines an urban area (urbanised area agglomeration or urban centre) as a continuously built up land mass of urban development that is within a labor market (metropolitan area), without regard for administrative boundaries.

List

Largest cities proper
This list features the most populous cities in ASEAN. Population figures were taken from within the city proper only. See the article on each city for sources. Myanmar data is the least reliable and subject to revision. It is important to note, that the general area of Metro Manila has been divided into its political cities and is not counted as one urban city in this ranking. Therefore the metropolis' true population is not reflected in this ranking (it would otherwise be first or second in population size, depending on the definition of Jakarta's true city area).

Countries
List of cities in Brunei
List of cities in Cambodia
List of cities in Indonesia
List of cities in Laos
List of cities in Malaysia
List of cities in Myanmar
List of cities in the Philippines
List of cities in Thailand
List of cities in Vietnam

See also
Demographics of Asia
Lists of cities
Lists of cities by country

References
 Cambodia 2008 census via citypopulation.de
 Indonesia 2014 estimates via citypopulation.de
 Malaysia cities 
 Myanmar 2011 estimates via citypopulation.de
 Philippines 2010 census via citypopulation.de
 Vietnam 2009 census via citypopulation.de

ASEAN
Cities
ASEAN